The 2022 United States House of Representatives elections in Rhode Island were held on November 8, 2022, to elect the two U.S. representatives from the state of Rhode Island, one from each of the state's 2 congressional districts. The elections coincided with other elections to the House of Representatives, elections to the United States Senate and various state and local elections. It followed a primary election on September 13, 2022.

In the leadup to the 2022 redistricting cycle, many analysts believed that Rhode Island would lose its 2nd district and be relegated to at-large status. However, the state managed to keep both its districts. This was credited to an aggressive effort by Rhode Island officials and community leaders to make sure that as many residents completed the 2020 census as possible. Coincidentally, the announcement that Rhode Island would not lose a district was made by U.S. Secretary of Commerce Gina Raimondo, who previously served as Governor of Rhode Island from 2015 until her resignation in 2021 to become Commerce Secretary. Incumbent U.S. Representatives David Cicilline and Jim Langevin, who would have been forced to run against each other in a Democratic primary if the two districts were merged, both expressed relief at the announcement. 

This was the best U.S House generic ballot for Republicans and the best a Republican candidate has done in a House race in the state since 1992.

District 1 

Before redistricting, the 1st district encompassed parts of Providence, as well as eastern Rhode Island, including Aquidneck Island and Pawtucket. The incumbent is Democrat David Cicilline, who was re-elected with 70.8% of the vote in 2020.

Democratic primary

Candidates

Nominee
David Cicilline, incumbent U.S Representative

Endorsements

Results

Republican primary

Candidates

Nominee
Allen Waters, investment consultant and nominee for U.S. Senate in 2020

Results

Independents

Candidates

Declared 
Lenine Camacho
Jeffrey Lemire

General election

Predictions

Results

District 2 

Before redistricting, the 2nd district also took in parts of Providence, as well as western Rhode Island, including Coventry, Cranston, and Warwick. The incumbent is Democrat Jim Langevin, who was re-elected with 58.2% of the vote in 2020. On January 18, 2022, Langevin announced he would not seek re-election.

Democratic primary

Candidates

Nominee 
Seth Magaziner, Rhode Island General Treasurer and former candidate for Governor of Rhode Island in 2022

Eliminated in primary 
Omar Bah, journalist and founder and executive director of the Refugee Dream Center
Spencer Dickinson, former state representative and candidate for Governor of Rhode Island in 2018
Joy Fox, former staffer to incumbent Jim Langevin
Sarah Morgenthau, deputy assistant secretary for travel and tourism in the U.S. Department of Commerce and former member of the Rhode Island Governor's Homeland Security Advisory Board

Withdrew 
Cameron Moquin, former firefighter (endorsed Segal)
Michael Neary, political strategist and former John Kasich staffer
Ed Pacheco, former state representative and former chair of the Rhode Island Democratic Party

Declined 
Nicole Alexander-Scott, former director of the Rhode Island Department of Health
Gabe Amo, deputy director of the Office of Intergovernmental Affairs
Sam Bell, state senator
Dylan Conley, chair of the Providence Board of Licenses, son of former state senator William Conley Jr., and candidate for this district in 2020
Jorge Elorza, Mayor of Providence
Helena Foulkes, former CVS executive (running for governor)
Nellie Gorbea, Rhode Island Secretary of State (running for governor)
Jim Langevin, incumbent U.S Representative (endorsed Magaziner)
Nicholas Mattiello, former Speaker of the Rhode Island House of Representatives
Sabina Matos, Lieutenant Governor of Rhode Island (running for re-election)
Carol McEntee, state representative
Joshua Miller, state senator (running for reelection)
James Sheehan, former state senator
Joe Shekarchi, Speaker of the Rhode Island House of Representatives
Teresa Tanzi, state representative

Endorsements

Polling

Results

Republican primary

Candidates

Nominee 
Allan Fung, former Mayor of Cranston and nominee for Governor of Rhode Island in 2014 and 2018

Withdrew 
Jessica de la Cruz, state senator (endorsed Fung)
Robert Lancia, former state representative and nominee for this district in 2020

Polling

Results

Moderate Party

Candidates

Declared 
William Gilbert

Independents

Candidates

Declared 
Don Antonia
Patricia Landy, school teacher
John D. Ritchie

General election

Predictions

Endorsements

Polling 
Aggregate polls

Graphical summary

Omar Bah vs. Allan Fung

Joy Fox vs. Allan Fung

Sarah Morgenthau vs. Allan Fung

David Segal vs. Allan Fung

Generic Democrat vs. generic Republican

Cameron Moquin vs. Allan Fung

Results

Notes 

Partisan clients

References

External links 
Official campaign websites for 1st district candidates
 David Cicilline (D) for Congress
 Allen Waters (R) for Congress

Official campaign websites for 2nd district candidates
 Allan Fung (R) for Congress
 Seth Magaziner (D) for Congress

2022
Rhode Island
United States House of Representatives